Total Divas is an American reality television series that premiered on July 28, 2013, on E!. The series gave viewers an inside look of the lives of WWE Divas from their work within WWE to their personal lives. Behind the scene footage of the Divas is also included. Season 4 also drew a cable ranking of No. 5.

Production
On September 5, 2015, an online article states that there could be a strong possibility Total Divas will be renewed for a fifth season. It reads that season four will "wrap up this fall" and the new season "won't air till 2016 some time". On September 9, 2015, Naomi revealed on Twitter that she had been taken off the main cast after the mid-season finale, which is expected to air on September 29.  Season four may be extended following the mid-season hiatus instead of jumping to season five. There has been speculation that WWE Tough Enough runner-up Amanda Saccomanno may join the cast after the mid-season hiatus. It was later confirmed that Amanda will be joining the cast. After the September 22 episode of Total Divas aired, it was announced that the following weeks episode would serve as the season finale, rather than a mid-season finale.

Season 5 was announced on October 6, 2015, which started airing in January 2016 with a majority of last season's cast returning. Naomi was officially removed from the main cast with Mandy taking her place and Rosa Mendes returning as a series regular.

Cast

Main cast
 Brie Bella (Brianna Danielson)
 Eva Marie (Natalie Marie Coyle)
 Natalya (Natalie Neidhart-Wilson)
 Nikki Bella (Stephanie Garcia-Colace)
 Rosa Mendes (Milena Roucka)
 Alicia Fox (Victoria Crawford)
 Paige (Saraya-Jade Bevis)
 Mandy Rose (Amanda Rose Saccomanno)

Recurring cast
 Summer Rae (Danielle Moinet)
 Daniel Bryan (Brie's husband)
 Tyson Kidd (Natalya's husband)
 John Cena (Nikki's fiancé)
 Mark Carrano (WWE Senior Director of Talent Relations)
 Kathy Colace (Brie & Nikki's mother)
 Ellie Neidhart (Nattie's mother)
 Jim Neidhart (Nattie's father)
 Renee Young (Renee Paquette)
 Dolph Ziggler (Nicholas "Nick" Nemeth)
 Kevin Skaff (Paige's ex-boyfriend)
 Bobby Schubenski (Rosa's fiancé)

Guest stars
 JoJo (Joseann Offerman)
 Naomi (Trinity Fatu)
 Jimmy Uso (Naomi's husband)
 Jonathan Coyle (Eva Marie's husband)
 Dean Ambrose (Jonathan "Jon" Good)
 Emma (Tenille Dashwood)
 Lilian Garcia (WWE Ring Announcer)
 J.J. Garcia (Brie & Nikki's brother)
 Jenni Neidhart (Nattie's sister)

Episodes

Ratings

References

Notes

  They dated from May 2015 to February 2016.

Citations

External links

 
 

2016 American television seasons
Total Divas